Call management is the process of designing and implementing inbound telephone call parameters, which govern the routing of these calls through a network. The process is most prominently utilized by corporations and the call centre industry and has its highest effectiveness when call logging software tools are used. Calls are routed according to the set up of calling features within the given system such as Call queues, IVR menus, Hunt groups and Recorded announcements. Call features provide a customised experience for the caller and maximize the efficiency of inbound call handling. Call management parameters can specify how calls are distributed according to an operator's skill level in relation to a call, the time and/or date of a call, the location of the caller or through automatic routing processes.

Calling features
Call management features vary from system to system and are based on an organization's needs to enhance customer experience. The systems commonly retain information from received calls which is stored, and can be analysed and interpreted by a system administrator. A call detail record or call recording software is used to record all received calls, including time, date, duration, calling number and called number for future reference.

Interactive voice response is a sound recording device that allows a caller to give information to a system verbally about what services or support they require. It uses speech recognition to direct callers on how to proceed while on the line. 
Another sound-based application is call whispering, which is a message played to an agent after answering a call that can give them information about the call in advance based on the Caller ID, number dialed or route taken through the system.

Call management can also include directory programming for received calls. A hunt group is a directory containing one or many destination numbers. Upon receiving an incoming call, the directory is programmed to ring in a particular order, simultaneously or simply in the order in which they have most recently answered before being sent to a final destination if still unanswered. Alternatively, call queues can be used to keep a caller on hold until one of the destination numbers becomes available.

Routing
Call routing is the internal process of selecting a path for inbound telephone calls whether to individual agents or queues and often uses computer telephony integration system (CTI) to function within a network. Automated process include translation, which is the automatic routing of inbound calls from one telephone number to another, and auto attendants, which are large directories of extension numbers to provide a caller with access to their preferred destination. Lastly, fax to email is used for routing inbound fax calls to one or more email addresses, usually as attachments.

Corporations and call centres have developed more specified criteria, which center around either the knowledge and/or skill level of an agent receiving the call, the location of the caller or the time and/or date of a call. Skills-based routing is programmed to route calls on to different destinations after identifying the most qualified and knowledgeable agent available to address a caller's needs. It is sometimes works in conjunction with omnichannel routing, where the priority of the call, the context of the customer journey and the agent's workload in real time are all taken into account. Older criteria-centered routing methods include location-based routing, which is programmed to route calls on to different destinations depending on the location of the caller, and time-based routing (also known as date-based routing), which is programmed to route calls to different destinations depending the time or date of the call.

See also
Direct Inward Dialing
DnD - Do Not Disturb (Telecommunication)

References

Teletraffic